Waldir Maranhão Cardoso (born 4 August 1955) is a Brazilian politician and a member of the Brazilian Social Democracy Party (PSDB). He was rector of the State University of Maranhão (Universidade Estadual do Maranhão) before being elected to the Chamber of Deputies in 2006. As Vice President of the Chamber (since 2007) he became Acting President of the Chamber of Deputies on 5 May 2016 following the suspension of Eduardo Cunha, until new elections were held on July 13, with Rodrigo Maia as the new president.

References

1955 births
Living people
People from São Luís, Maranhão
Presidents of the Chamber of Deputies (Brazil)
Progressistas politicians
Brazilian Social Democracy Party politicians
Members of the Chamber of Deputies (Brazil) from Maranhão
Brazilian veterinarians
Rectors of universities in Brazil